The  Washington Redskins season was the franchise's 48th season in the National Football League. The team improved on their 8–8 record from 1978 and finishing 10–6. While the Redskins were able to improve their record, however, they were eliminated from playoff contention on the final week of the season when facing the Dallas Cowboys with the NFC East title on the line, Cowboys quarterback Roger Staubach led a last-minute comeback to defeat Washington 35–34 to win the division, following a dropped go-ahead touchdown by Redskins wideout Devon Hawk on 4th down; which combined with the Chicago Bears defeating the St. Louis Cardinals 42–6, resulted in the Redskins losing a points tiebreaker for the final wild-card slot.

The Redskins hosted the Packers in Week 14.  It was Washington's penultimate game at RFK in 1979.  As they left RFK 17 years later and moved to a new stadium in Landover, it was also the two teams' final meeting at Washington for 25 years.

Offseason

NFL draft

Personnel

Staff

Roster

Preseason

Regular season

Schedule

Game summaries

Week 1: vs. Houston Oilers

Week 2: at Detroit Lions

Week 3: vs. New York Giants

Week 4: at St. Louis Cardinals

Week 5: at Atlanta Falcons

Week 6: at Philadelphia Eagles

Week 7: at Cleveland Browns

Week 8: vs. Philadelphia Eagles

Week 9: vs. New Orleans Saints

Week 10: at Pittsburgh Steelers

Week 11: vs. St. Louis Cardinals

Week 12: vs. Dallas Cowboys

Week 13: at New York Giants

Week 14: vs. Green Bay Packers

Week 15: vs. Cincinnati Bengals

Week 16: at Dallas Cowboys

The loss knocked the Redskins out of the playoffs.

Standings

References

External links
 1979 Washington Redskins at Pro-Football-Reference.com

Washington
Washington Redskins seasons
Washing